Deilelater is a genus of click beetle (family Elateridae). They are one of several genera in the tribe Pyrophorini, all of which are bioluminescent. Most of the species were formerly in the genus Pyrophorus.

List of species
 Deilelater atlanticus (Hyslop, 1918)
 Deilelater bellamyi (Van Zwaluwenburg, 1936)
 Deilelater mexicanus (Champion, 1896)
 Deilelater physoderus (Germar, 1841)
 Deilelater radians (Champion, 1896)
 Deilelater sirius (Candèze, 1878)
 Deilelater stella (Candèze, 1863)
 Deilelater ustulatus Costa, 1983

References

Elateridae genera
Bioluminescent insects